Revenue Retrievin': Graveyard Shift is the fourteenth studio album of the American rapper E-40, it was released on March 29, 2011 simultaneously along with his thirteenth album, Revenue Retrievin': Overtime Shift, the same way that he released his eleventh and twelfth albums.

The album has 20 tracks, and the featured guests include T-Pain, Tech N9ne, Bosko, Bun B, Slim Thug and Turf Talk, among others.

Singles
"She Smashed the Homie" was released as promotional single for the album. The song features Snoop Dogg and Ray J.

A music video for "Concrete" was released on April 6, 2011 and one for "That Candy Paint" featuring Bun B and Slim Thug was released on May 15.

Reception

Commercial performance
Revenue Retrievin': Graveyard Shift debuted at number 40 on the US Billboard 200, with approximately 44,000 units sold in the first week.

Track listing

Notes
 Cousin Fik and Laroo T.H.H. are not credited on "Barbarian"
 Laroo T.H.H. is not credited on "Spooky"
 Decadez is not credited on "The Streets Don't Love Nobody"

Sample credits
"43" – Contains a sample of "Who Do You Believe In" by Scarface
"That Candy Paint" – Contains a sample of "You're Everything" by Bun B featuring Rick Ross, David Banner & 8Ball & MJG

Charts

References

E-40 albums
2011 albums
Albums produced by JellyRoll
Albums produced by T-Pain
Albums produced by Droop-E
Albums produced by Bosko
EMI Records albums